Rathlin Island (Local Irish dialect: Reachraidh, ; Scots: Racherie) is an island and civil parish off the coast of County Antrim (of which it is part) in Northern Ireland. It is Northern Ireland's northernmost point.

Geography 
Rathlin is the only inhabited offshore island of Northern Ireland, with a steadily growing population of approximately 150 people, and is the most northerly inhabited island off the coast of the island of Ireland.

It is part of the Causeway Coast and Glens council area, and is represented by the Rathlin Development & Community Association.

Townland 
Rathlin is part of the traditional barony of Cary (around the town of Ballycastle), and of current district Moyle. The island constitutes a civil parish and is subdivided into 22 townlands:

Irish language 
The Irish language was originally spoken on Rathlin Island until around the 1960s and was perhaps the main community language until the early 20th century. As it is located between the Irish and Scottish mainland, the dialect found on Rathlin shared many features of both the Irish and Scottish Gaelic languages while also being unique in structure and grammar, e.g. forming plurals with -án or -eán  doing away with inflection for weak nouns and suffixes for strong ones.

In addition, the phonology of the dialect was quite divergent, compare íorbáll  with Standard Irish eireaball  and Scottish Gaelic   ("tail").

Transport 

Two ferries operate on the route – the fast foot-passenger-only catamaran ferry Rathlin Express and a purpose-built larger ferry, commissioned in May 2017, Spirit of Rathlin, which carries both foot passengers and a small number of vehicles, weather permitting. Rathlin Island Ferry Ltd won a six-year contract for the service in 2008 providing it as a subsidised "lifeline" service. There is an ongoing investigation on how the transfer was handled between the Environment Minister and the new owners.

Natural history 
Rathlin is of prehistoric volcanic origin, having been created as part of the British Tertiary Volcanic Province.

The island was owned by Rev Robert Gage who was also the island's rector. He had two daughters, Adelaide in 1832 and Dorothea in 1835. Adelaide was a botanist who wrote a book concerning the island's flora and fauna. She visited Dorothea in Germany after she married his Serene Highness Albrecht, Prince of Warbeck and Pyrmonte. Adelaide was buried in Ramoan Churchyard in Ballycastle in 1920 and her book on Rathlin is now lost.

Rathlin is one of 43 Special Areas of Conservation in Northern Ireland. It is home to tens of thousands of seabirds, including common guillemots, kittiwakes, puffins and razorbills – about thirty bird families in total. It is visited by birdwatchers, with a Royal Society for the Protection of Birds nature reserve that has views of Rathlin's bird colony. The RSPB has also successfully managed natural habitat to facilitate the return of the red-billed chough. Northern Ireland's only breeding pair of choughs can be seen during the summer months.

Bruce's Cave  is named after Robert the Bruce, also known as Robert I of Scotland: it was here that he was said to have seen the legendary spider which is described as inspiring Bruce to continue his fight for Scottish independence. The island is also the northernmost point of the Antrim Coast and Glens Area of Outstanding Natural Beauty.

In 2008-09, the Maritime and Coastguard Agency of the United Kingdom and the Marine Institute Ireland undertook bathymetric survey work north of Antrim, updating Admiralty charts (Joint Irish Bathymetric Survey Project). In doing so a number of interesting submarine geological features were identified around Rathlin Island, including a submerged crater or lake on a plateau with clear evidence of water courses feeding it. This suggests the events leading to inundation – subsidence of land or rising water levels – were extremely quick.

Marine investigations in the area have also identified new species of sea anemone, rediscovered the fan mussel (the UK's largest and rarest bivalve mollusc – thought to be found only in Plymouth Sound and a few sites off the west of Scotland) and a number of shipwreck sites, including HMS Drake, which was torpedoed and sank just off the island in 1917.

Algae 
Species of algae recorded from Rathlin, such as Hypoglossum hypoglossoides , Apoglossum ruscifolium , Radicilingua thysanorhizans  and Haraldiophyllum bonnemaisonii , were noted by Osborne Morton in 1994. Maps showing the distribution of algae all around the British Isles, including Rathlin Island, are to be found in Harvey and Guiry 2003.

Flowering plants 
Details and notes of the flowering plants are to be found in Hackney.

Archaeology 

The island has been settled at least as far back as the Mesolithic period. A Neolithic stone axe factory featuring porcellanite stone is to be found in Brockley, a cluster of houses within the townland of Ballygill Middle. It is similar to a stone axe factory found at Tievebulliagh mountain on the nearby mainland coast.  The products of these two axe factories, which cannot be reliably distinguished from each other, were traded across Ireland; these were the most important Irish stone axe sources of their time.

In 2006, an ancient burial was discovered when a driveway was being expanded by the island's only pub, dating back to the early Bronze Age, ca. 2000 BC. Genomic analysis of DNA from the bodies showed a strong continuity with the genetics of the modern Irish population and established that the continuity of Irish population dates back at least 1000 years longer than had previously been understood.

There is also an unexcavated Viking vessel in a mound formation.

History 
Rathlin was probably known to the Romans, Pliny referring to "Reginia" and Ptolemy to "Rhicina" or "Eggarikenna". In the 7th century, Adomnán mentions "Rechru" and "Rechrea insula", which may also have been early names for Rathlin. The 11th century Irish version of the Historia Brittonum states that the Fir Bolg "took possession of Man and of other islands besides – Arran, Islay and 'Racha'" – another possible early variant.

Rathlin was the site of the first Viking raid on Ireland, according to the Annals of Ulster. The pillaging of the island's church and burning of its buildings took place in 795.

In 1306, Robert the Bruce sought refuge upon Rathlin, owned by the Irish Bissett family. He stayed in Rathlin Castle, originally belonging to their lordship the Glens of Antrim. The Bissetts were dispossessed of Rathlin by the English, who were in control of the Earldom of Ulster, for welcoming Bruce. In the 16th century, the island came into the possession of the MacDonnells of Antrim.

Rathlin has been the site of a number of massacres. On an expedition in 1557, Sir Henry Sidney devastated the island. In July 1575, the Earl of Essex sent Francis Drake and John Norreys to confront Scottish refugees on the island, and in the ensuing massacre, hundreds of men, women and children of Clan MacDonnell were killed. Also in 1642, Covenanter Campbell soldiers of the Argyll's Foot were encouraged by their commanding officer Sir Duncan Campbell of Auchinbreck to kill the local Catholic MacDonalds, near relatives of their arch clan enemy in the Scottish Highlands Clan MacDonald. They threw scores of MacDonald women over cliffs to their deaths on rocks below. The number of victims of this massacre has been put as low as 100 and as high as 3,000.

She steamed into Church Bay on Rathlin Island, where, after her crew was taken off, she capsized and sank. On 27 January 1918, the RMS Andania was hit amidships by a torpedo from German submarine U-46 captained by Leo Hillebrand. The ship immediately took a list to starboard and began to sink. Attempts were made to tow the ship but it sank after a few hours. The passengers were saved, but Andania'''s sinking killed seven crew members. The wreck is lying at a depth of between 175 and 189 metres.

 Commerce 

In 1746, the island was purchased by the Reverend John Gage. Rathlin was an important producer of kelp in the 18th century.

A 19th-century British visitor to the island found that they had an unusual form of government where they elected a judge who sat on a "throne of turf". In fact, Robert Gage was the "proprietor of the island" until his death in 1891. Gage held a master's degree from Trinity College, Dublin, but he spent his life on the island creating his book "The Birds of Rathlin Island".

Tourism is now a commercial activity. The island had a population of over one thousand in the 19th century. Its current permanent population is around 125. This is swollen by visitors in the summer, with most coming to view the cliffs and their huge seabird populations. Many visitors come for the day, and the island has around 30 beds for overnight visitors. The Boathouse Visitors' Centre at Church Bay is open seven days a week from April to September, with minibus tours and bicycle hire also available. The island is also popular with scuba divers, who come to explore the many wrecked ships in the surrounding waters.

Richard Branson's hot air balloon crashed near Rathlin Island in 1987.

On 29 January 2008, the RNLI Portrush lifeboat Katie Hannan grounded after a swell hit its stern on breakwater rocks just outside the harbour on Rathlin while trying to refloat an islander's RIB. The lifeboat was declared beyond economical repair and handed over to a salvage company.

 Communications 

The world's first commercial wireless telegraphy link was established by employees of Guglielmo Marconi between East Lighthouse on Rathlin and Kenmara House in Ballycastle on 6 July 1898.

In July 2013, BT installed a high-speed wireless broadband pilot project to a number of premises, the first deployment of its kind anywhere in the UK, 'wireless to the cabinet' (WTTC) to deliver 80 Mb/s to users.

 References 
 Chadwick, Hector Munro (1949) Early Scotland: the Picts, the Scots & the Welsh of southern Scotland. Cambridge University Press.
 Watson, W. J. (1994) The Celtic Place-Names of Scotland''. Edinburgh; Birlinn. . First published in Edinburgh; The Royal Celtic Society, 1926.
 Rathlin Island and the Gaelic Language (2005) "Rathlin Island and the Gaelic Language". Rathlin Island and the Gaelic Language

Notes

External links 

 

Civil parishes of County Antrim
Extinct volcanism
Islands of County Antrim
Paleogene Ireland
Paleogene volcanism
Protected areas of County Antrim
Royal Society for the Protection of Birds reserves in Northern Ireland
Special Areas of Conservation in Northern Ireland
Special Protection Areas in County Antrim
Volcanism of Northern Ireland